María Griselda Hinojosa Flores (20 April 1875 – 1959) was a Chilean pharmacist. She became the first woman to practice pharmacy in the country after earning a degree from the University of Chile in 1899.

Biography
Griselda Hinojosa was born in Copiapó on 20 April 1875, the fourth daughter of Pablo Hinojosa and Mercedes Flores. She studied at the Rafael Valdés Private School for Girls and at the Copiapó Lyceum for Girls.

She studied pharmacy at the University of Chile, graduating on 4 December 1899 with the thesis Contribución al estudio del Solanum Tomatillo (Natri) (Contribution to the Study of the Solanum Tomatillo).

References

Further reading

External links

1875 births
1959 deaths
Chilean pharmacists
People from Copiapó
University of Chile alumni
Women pharmacists